Eulepidotis guttata is a moth of the family Erebidae first described by Felder and Rogenhofer in 1874. It is found in the Neotropics, including Costa Rica, Peru, French Guiana, Guyana and the Brazilian state of Amazonas.

References

Moths described in 1874
guttata